Keron Julius Cottoy (born 14 November 1989) is a Vincentian cricketer who has played for several teams in West Indian domestic cricket. He has represented the St Lucia Zouks and St.Kitts Patriots franchises in the Caribbean Premier League (CPL).

A former Windward Islands under-19s player, Cottoy was a member of the inaugural intake of the West Indies High Performance Centre in 2010, and represented HPC teams at the 2010–11 WICB Cup and 2011–12 Regional Super50. He made his first-class debut for Windward Islands at the 2010–11 Regional Four Day Competition, which followed several games for the side at the 2010 Caribbean Twenty20. After a couple seasons with no higher-level appearances, Cottoy switched to the Combined Campuses and Colleges for the 2014–15 Regional Super50. He also signed with the St Lucia Zouks franchise for the 2015 Caribbean Premier League season, making his debut for the team against the St Kitts and Nevis Patriots. In Cottoy's third match for the Zouks, against the Guyana Amazon Warriors, he took a career-best 4/18 from four overs.

In October 2019, he was named in the Windward Islands' squad for the 2019–20 Regional Super50 tournament. In March 2020, in round six of the 2019–20 West Indies Championship, Cottoy scored his maiden century in first-class cricket.

References

External links
Player profile and statistics at CricketArchive
Player profile and statistics at ESPNcricinfo

1989 births
Living people
Combined Campuses and Colleges cricketers
Saint Lucia Kings cricketers
Saint Vincent and the Grenadines cricketers
Windward Islands cricketers
People from Charlotte Parish, Saint Vincent and the Grenadines